Vallarta Dancers is a sculpture by Jim Demetro, installed along Puerto Vallarta's Malecón, in the Mexican state of Jalisco.

References

External links

 

Dance in art
Outdoor sculptures in Puerto Vallarta
Sculptures of men in Mexico
Sculptures of women in Mexico
Statues in Jalisco
Centro, Puerto Vallarta